John Newcombe defeated Ken Rosewall in the final, 5–7, 6–3, 6–2, 3–6, 6–1 to win the gentlemen's singles tennis title at the 1970 Wimbledon Championships. It was his second Wimbledon singles title, and his fifth major singles title overall.

Rod Laver was the two time defending champion, but lost in the fourth round to Roger Taylor.

Seeds

  Rod Laver (fourth round)
  John Newcombe (champion)
  Arthur Ashe (fourth round)
  Tony Roche (quarterfinals)
  Ken Rosewall (final)
  Željko Franulović (third round)
  Stan Smith (fourth round)
  Ilie Năstase (fourth round)
  Clark Graebner (quarterfinals)
  Roy Emerson (quarterfinals)
  Tom Okker (second round)
  Cliff Drysdale (third round)
  Jan Kodeš (first round)
  Andrés Gimeno (semifinals)
  Dennis Ralston (fourth round)
  Roger Taylor (semifinals)

Qualifying

Draw

Finals

Top half

Section 1

Section 2

Section 3

Section 4

Bottom half

Section 5

Section 6

Section 7

Section 8

References

External links

 1970 Wimbledon Championships – Men's draws and results at the International Tennis Federation

Men's Singles
Wimbledon Championship by year – Men's singles